Inuyasha the Movie: The Castle Beyond the Looking Glass is a 2002 Japanese animated fantasy adventure film based on Inuyasha manga series written and illustrated by Rumiko Takahashi. The film is directed by Toshiya Shinohara, written by Katsuyuki Sumisawa, and produced by Sunrise. The film was released in Japan on December 21, 2002.

In the film, Inuyasha and his friends seemingly kill Naraku for good and return to their normal lives, only to encounter a new enemy named Kaguya, a character based on the literary classic The Tale of the Bamboo Cutter.

The film marks the second film for the Inuyasha series, following Affection Touching Across Time (2001) and followed up by Swords of an Honorable Ruler (2003).

Plot

Half-demon Inuyasha, schoolgirl Kagome, monk Miroku, demon slayer Sango, and fox demon Shippo battle and defeat their archenemy Naraku. As a result, Miroku's Wind Tunnel that Naraku cursed his family with disappears from his hand, while elsewhere, Sango's brother Kohaku is freed from Naraku's grasp as a human puppet. With Naraku apparently defeated, Inuyasha, Kagome, and Shippo part ways with Miroku and Sango to continue searching for the shards of the Shikon Jewel. Miroku returns to his master, Mushin, and Sango returns to her village and finds the amnesiac Kohaku there. Mushin presents Miroku with a task that is to be given to the surviving descendant of his family who defeats Naraku: to destroy a yōkai who threatens to cast the world into eternal night.

Kagura and Kanna, two of Naraku's incarnations, come across a mirror in a hidden shrine and awaken a maiden who declares herself to be Kaguya, Princess of the Heavens. In exchange for freeing her, Kaguya promises to give Kagura her true heart's desire; freedom. Kagura and Kanna set out to recover five items that will free Kaguya from her mirror completely.

Inuyasha travels to the modern era looking for Kagome, alongside her brother Sota. In town, Kagome angrily hides Inuyasha from the public in a photo booth which Sota jokingly puts coins into, taking photos of the two as they are arguing. Back in the Feudal era, Kagome takes their faces from one of the photos and places them in a heart-shaped necklace locket that she offers to Inuaysha, who seemingly rejects it. Later, they run into Kagura, Kanna, and Kaguya, the former of which rips off a sleeve of Inuyasha's Robe of the Fire-Rat as it is one of the five items. Kagome forces the demons to flee after the battle, with Kaguya noticing the strange aura surrounding her that does not match the time of the Feudal era. Afterwards, Inuyasha, Kagome and Shippo meet Akitoki Hōjō, the ancestor of Kagome's classmate Hōjō, who plans to dispose a celestial robe into Mount Fuji.

Miroku and his tanuki servant Hachi learn, while searching for the yōkai he is meant to destroy, that his grandfather defeated Kaguya, leading to her celestial robe being entrusted to the Hōjō family. With Kaguya and Kanna having found the remaining items, Kaguya goes to find the robe alone, fighting Inuyasha for it. She restrains him to a tree, and Kagome sacrifices herself to protect him from a sacred arrow that Kaguya deflected from her. Kaguya takes Kagome captive, offering to release her alive in exchange for Inuyasha becoming Kaguya's servant.

Kaguya has begun to freeze time into eternal night. Kagura suspects that Kaguya is not who she says she is and tries to attack her, but Kaguya teleports Kagura and Kanna elsewhere. Following his escape, Inuyasha, Hōjō, and Shippo join with Miroku, Hachi, Sango, Kohaku, and Sango's nekomata companion Kirara to infiltrate Kaguya's mountain castle in Lake Motosu. Excluding Hachi and Hōjō, they use items from Kagome's first aid kit from the modern era to survive the time freeze, while Inuyasha remains unaffected having worn Kagome's locket. They battle Kaguya to no avail, and she transforms Inuyasha into a full-fledged demon. A restrained Kagome pleads Inuyasha to stop, but upon being freed by Shippo, she shares a kiss with Inuyasha to revert him back to his normal self; he promises to remain a half-demon longer for her sake.

After Kaguya reveals that she is a demon who absorbed the real Kaguya, Naraku appears, having faked his death by hiding in Kohaku's back, waiting for Kaguya to come out of hiding to absorb her power and gain his own immortality. The heroes defeat Kaguya before Naraku can absorb her, and she is killed by Miroku's restored Wind Tunnel. Everyone flees the collapsing castle through Kanna's mirror with Naraku taking Kohaku with him. The heroes return to safety with time being reverted to normal. Inuyasha, Kagome, Miroku, Sango, Shippo and Kirara resume their mission to find the Shinkon Jewel shards, and Hōjō disposes the robe at Mount Fuji.

Voice cast

Production

Development
The film is produced by the same staff members from the previous film: Toshiya Shinohara directed the film at Sunrise, Katsuyuki Sumisawa wrote the screenplay, Hideyuki Motohashi designed the characters and acted as a chief animation director, and Kaoru Wada composed the music.

Music
The theme song, "Yurayura", is performed by Every Little Thing.

Release
The film was released in Japanese theaters on December 21, 2002.

Notes

References

External links

2002 anime films
Demons in film
Films based on works by Rumiko Takahashi
Films set in castles
Films set in feudal Japan
Castle Beyond the Looking Glass, The
2000s Japanese-language films
Japanese animated fantasy films
Odex
Viz Media anime
Films scored by Kaoru Wada

ja:犬夜叉 (映画)#犬夜叉 鏡の中の夢幻城